Kərgəlan (also, Gergelan, Gerkilan, Kergelan, Kyargalan, and Kyargelan) is a village and municipality in the Lankaran Rayon of Azerbaijan.  It has a population of 3,002.

References 

Populated places in Lankaran District